Tolerable dose may refer to:
Maximum tolerated dose before death
Tolerable upper intake levels, maximal recommended dietary intake not to have harmful effects